Taejongdae is a natural park of Busan, South Korea with magnificent cliffs facing the open sea on the southernmost tip of island of Yeongdo-gu. It is a representative visitor attraction of Busan that has dense evergreen trees and several facilities for tourists such as an observatory, an amusement park, a light house, a cruise ship terminal. It is said that its name to have taken from King Taejong Muyeol (604 - 661), the 29th king of the Silla Kingdom who liked to practice archery there after the unification of the Three Kingdoms of Korea. Taejongdae is designated as the 28 Busan monument, along with Oryukdo Island.

Gallery

See also
Haeundae
Gwangalli Beach

References

External links

Information about Taejongdae
City of Busan - busan official site

Tourist attractions in Busan
Parks in Busan
Geography of Busan